Emir Smajic (born 3 February 1989) is a Swedish-Bosnian footballer who currently plays for Västerås SK as a forward.

Career statistics

External links

1989 births
Living people
Association football forwards
Östersunds FK players
IK Sirius Fotboll players
Västerås SK Fotboll players
IF Brommapojkarna players
Achilles '29 players
Eerste Divisie players
Swedish footballers
Swedish expatriate footballers
Allsvenskan players
Superettan players
Ettan Fotboll players
Expatriate footballers in the Netherlands